Rho-related BTB domain-containing protein 3 is a protein that in humans is encoded by the RHOBTB3 gene.

Function 

RHOBTB3 is a member of the evolutionarily conserved RhoBTB subfamily of Rho GTPases. For background information on RHOBTBs, see RHOBTB1 (MIM 607351).[supplied by OMIM]

Model organisms

Model organisms have been used in the study of RHOBTB3 function. A conditional knockout mouse line, called Rhobtb3tm1a(KOMP)Wtsi was generated as part of the International Knockout Mouse Consortium program — a high-throughput mutagenesis project to generate and distribute animal models of disease to interested scientists.

Male and female animals underwent a standardized phenotypic screen to determine the effects of deletion. Twenty three tests were carried out on mutant mice and four significant abnormalities were observed. Homozygote mutant males had a decreased body weight and abnormal tooth morphology; females had decreased forepaw grip strength and both sexes had a decreased body length.

References

Further reading 

 
 
 
 
 

Genes mutated in mice